Agrasen Jayanti (literally "Agrasen's birthday") is the birth anniversary celebration of a legendary Hindu king Agrasen Maharaj. He was king of Agroha, and it was from him that the Agrawal caste originated. Agrasen Jayanti is observed on the fourth day of Ashwin month of Hindu calendar.

The Government of India issued a postage stamp in honor of Maharaja Agresen in 1976 on occasion of his 5100th Jayanti.

Public holiday 
The UP state Government has officially declared holiday on the occasion of Agrasen Jayanti in Uttar Pradesh. In North Indian state of Haryana, there is also a public holiday on Agrasen Jayanti. This day is a gazetted holiday in the state of Punjab and Haryana.

Celebration 

Devotees make special preparations to make Maharaja Agrasen Jayanti special. The birth anniversary of divine leader Maharaja Agrasen with colorful procession and various cultural programmes which is conducted throughout the day at different places of the India. The Jayanti is celebrated by the Vaishya community with full religious devotion. Agrasena jayanti is celebrated in across India among Agrahari, Agrawal and Jain. On this day, descendants of Agrasena busy themselves in social welfare activities. Free medical camps, food distribution and several cultural functions and program are taken up to spread the message of equality and brotherhood. They honor Agrasen for his ideals in life and try to follow his footsteps.

References

Hindu festivals
September observances
October observances

Religious festivals in India